Charles H. Fletcher III is an American climate scientist and geologist. He studies sea level rise and shoreline change with a particular focus on how climate change will affect communities in the Pacific Islands. In addition to his research, Fletcher advocates for human adaptation to sea level rise.

Fletcher is currently the Interim Dean of the School of Ocean and Earth Science and Technology at the University of Hawaiʻi at Mānoa, as well as chairperson of the Honolulu Climate Change Commission.

Career 
In 1991, Fletcher joined the Department of Earth Sciences (then called the Department of Geology and Geophysics) at the School of Ocean and Earth Science and Technology (SOEST) at the University of Hawaiʻi at Mānoa. He was promoted to professor in 1998, and chaired the department for two terms before 2010, when he became SOEST associate dean for academic affairs. On January 1, 2022, Fletcher was named Interim Dean of SOEST.

In July 2018, Fletcher spoke at a climate change conference on Majuro, the capital of the Marshall Islands. While noting that this approach would be expensive and environmentally disruptive, he stated that "I would rather destroy some reef than see an entire culture go extinct."

In October 2018, Fletcher and a team of researchers were in the process of studying East Island, one of the Northwestern Hawaiian Islands when it was destroyed in a storm surge caused by Hurricane Walaka. Fletcher had predicted that the island would be fully inundated by sea level rise within 10 to 30 years, but expressed disappointment that it was gone so soon, describing the event as "a huge blow" to both his research and the species (including the critically endangered Hawaiian monk seal and threatened green sea turtle) that inhabited the island. While the hurricane may have been coincidental, it was abnormally far north, and Fletcher noted that a strong hurricane on this path "is made more probable under the conditions of climate change [and] global warming". He described East Island as a "proxy" for countries on similar low-lying atolls, including the Marshall Islands, the Maldives, Tuvalu and Kiribati, and stated that the destruction of East Island demonstrated the risk to these nations.

Fletcher attended the 2021 United Nations Climate Change Conference as part of a University of Hawaiʻi delegation. He later criticized the exclusivity of the conference and the compromise-based nature of the negotiation process, describing it as fundamentally flawed.

With his students, Fletcher has published more than 100 peer-reviewed articles, in addition to 3 textbooks. He tracks beach erosion in Hawaii, and simulates the effect that various sea level rise scenarios would have on the Hawaiian Islands. Data published by Fletcher's team are used in Hawaii for coastal infrastructure planning, including by Kauai County and Maui County for setback ordinances. Hawaii Senate Bill 474, the first seller disclosure law related to sea level rise in the United States, was based on data produced by his research team. Fletcher additionally chairs the Honolulu Climate Change Commission.

Adaptation to sea level rise 
Fletcher is an advocate for various methods of adaptation to sea level rise, which he describes as "an unsolvable problem that needs to be managed so we can decrease the amount of loss and suffering and damage that we experience". He has critiqued seawalls for their contribution to beach erosion, and advocated for an "exit strategy" in which coastal homeowners would be incentivized to move inland rather than attempting to maintain their coastal properties. He has additionally noted that the effect of climate change on the Pacific Islands is drastically larger than their historical contribution to climate change, and stated that the "major industrial nations responsible for global warming have a debt to the Pacific islands to assist with the adaptation that is necessary to survive this challenge".

Accolades 
Fletcher is a Geological Society of America Fellow. In 2010, Fletcher was awarded the Environmental Merit Award in Hawaii by the United States Environmental Protection Agency. The award recognized Fletcher's work with the Center for Island Climate Adaptation and Policy at the University of Hawaiʻi, and the EPA stated that "Dr. Chip Fletcher not only studies island climate adaptation and policy issues, but he also excels at communicating his findings to policy makers and the public".

Authored books

See also 
 Effects of climate change on small island countries

References

External links 

 Chip Fletcher at the University of Hawaiʻi at Mānoa School of Ocean and Earth Science and Technology
 Interview with Chip Fletcher in Yale Environment 360
 Opinion articles by Chip Fletcher in Honolulu Civil Beat
 Opinion articles by Chip Fletcher in The Hill

Living people
University of Hawaiʻi at Mānoa faculty
American climatologists
21st-century American geologists
Year of birth missing (living people)
Fellows of the Geological Society of America
Scientists from Hawaii